Flatfoot in Hong Kong (original title: Piedone a Hong Kong and also known as Flatfoot Goes East and Le Cogneur) is a 1975 crime comedy film directed by Steno and starring Bud Spencer. It is the second film of the "Flatfoot" film series. It is preceded by Flatfoot and followed by Flatfoot in Africa and Flatfoot in Egypt.

Plot
The police prepares to trap the Drug Lord of Naples. The plan fails and Rizzo (Bud Spencer) decides to interrogate him for the last time, but when he arrives the Drug Lord has been murdered. Rizzo is accused of the murder and decides to investigate the arrival of an Italian-American Mafia member, Frank Barella (Al Lettieri). The information given by Barella and Ferramenti (Dominic Barto) makes Rizzo believe that there is a rat in the police department, and, therefore, he must go to the Far East to find out who he is. On his way through Thailand, Hong Kong and Macau, Rizzo encounters Barella, and this leads him to believe who is the corrupt police senior.

Cast 
 Bud Spencer as Insp. 'Flatfoot' Rizzo 
 Al Lettieri as Frank Barella
 Robert Webber as Sam Accardo
 Enzo Cannavale as brigadiere Caputo 
 Nancy Sit as Makiko
 Francesco De Rosa as Goldhand 
 Renato Scarpa as Insp. Morabito

Additional Stunt Crew

 Addy Sung as Peking Opera Thug (uncredited)
 Hoi Sang Lee as Peking Opera Thug (uncredited)
 Lau Hok Min as Peking Opera Thug (uncredited)
 Jackie Chan as Peking Opera Thug (uncredited)
 Alan Chui Chung-San as Casino Police Informer (uncredited)
 Chu Tiet Wo as Casino Police Informer (uncredited)
 Poon Kin Kwan as Peking Opera Thug (uncredited)
 Tai San as Peking Opera Thug (uncredited)
 Tony Leung Siu Hung as Peking Opera thug (uncredited)
 Lee Fat Yuen as Peking Opera thug (uncredited)

References

External links

1975 films
1970s crime comedy films
Italian crime comedy films
1970s Italian-language films
English-language Italian films
Films scored by Guido & Maurizio De Angelis
1970s police comedy films
Films set in Hong Kong
Films set in Macau
Films set in Thailand
Films about the illegal drug trade
1975 comedy films
1970s Italian films
1970s English-language films
1975 multilingual films
Italian multilingual films